The Cody Enterprise is a newspaper in Cody, Wyoming.

Overview
It was established by Buffalo Bill and John Peake in 1899. The first issue appeared on August 31, 1899, and it was firmly established in 1902. In 1904, it was bought by Caroline Lockhart, a Prohibition crusader and novelist originally from Boston. She served as owner and editor from 1904 to 1962. In the summer of 1936, it featured articles about artists Edward Thomas Grigware and Stan Kershaw. It is now owned by Sage Publishing of Cody, Wyoming. It is published twice weekly. It has a circulation of 7,050.

References

Newspapers published in Wyoming